USS LST-556 was a United States Navy  in commission from 1944 to 1946.

Construction and commissioning
LST-556 was laid down on 4 February 1944 at Evansville, Indiana, by the Missouri Valley Bridge and Iron Company. She was launched on 7 April 1944, sponsored by Mrs. James C. Bradshaw, and commissioned on 1 May 1944.

Service history
During World War II, LST-556 was assigned to the Pacific Theater of Operations.  She participated in the capture and occupation of the southern Palau Islands in September and October 1944.  She then took part in the Philippines campaign, participating in the Leyte landings in October and November 1944, the landings at Ormoc Bay in December 1944, the landings at Mindoro in December 1944, and the landings at Zambales and Subic Bay in January 1945. She then participated in the assault on and occupation of Okinawa Gunto in April and May 1945.

Following the war, LST-556 returned to the United States.

Decommissioning and disposal
LST-556 was decommissioned on 14 March 1946 and stricken from the Navy List on 12 April 1946. On 26 April 1948, she was sold to the Sun Shipbuilding and Drydock Company of Chester, Pennsylvania, for scrapping.

Honors and awards
LST-556 earned five battle stars for her World War II service.

References

NavSource Online: Amphibious Photo Archive LST-556

 

LST-542-class tank landing ships
World War II amphibious warfare vessels of the United States
Ships built in Evansville, Indiana
1944 ships